16P/Brooks, also known as Brooks 2, is a periodic comet discovered by William Robert Brooks on July 7, 1889, but failed to note any motion. He was able to confirm the discovery the next morning, having seen that the comet had moved north. On August 1, 1889, the famous comet hunter Edward Emerson Barnard discovered two fragments of the comet labeled "B" and "C" located 1 and 4.5 arc minutes away. On August 2, he found another four or five, but these were no longer visible the next day. On August 4, he observed two more objects, labeled "D" and "E". "E" disappeared by the next night and "D" was gone by the next week. Around mid-month, "B" grew large and faint, finally disappearing at the beginning of September. "C" managed to survive until mid-November 1889. No new nuclei were discovered before the apparition ended on January 13, 1891.

The breakup is believed to have been caused by the passage of the comet within Jupiter's Roche limit in 1886, when it spent two days within the orbit of Io. After the discovery apparition, the comet has always been over two magnitudes fainter and no fragments have been seen since 1889.

On 31 December 2016 the comet passed 0.333 AU from Jupiter then on 3 July 2053 it will pass  from Jupiter.

References

External links 
 Orbital simulation from JPL (Java) / Horizons Ephemeris
 16P/Brooks 2 – Seiichi Yoshida @ aerith.net
16P at Kronk's Cometography

Periodic comets
0016
Comets in 2014
18890709